Petter is a predominantly Scandinavian masculine given name, found mostly in Norway and Sweden and to a much lesser extent in Denmark. It is a cognate of the name Peter.

Individuals bearing the name Petter include:

Petter (rapper) (born 1974), Swedish rapper
Petter Andersen (born 1974), Norwegian speed skater
Petter Andersson (born 1985), Swedish footballer
Petter Augustsson (born 1980), Swedish footballer
Petter Belsvik (born 1967), Norwegian footballer and coach
Petter Jakob Bjerve (1913–2004), Norwegian economist, statistician and politician
Petter Bjørheim (born 1965), Norwegian politician
Petter Bruer Hanssen (born 1986), Norwegian footballer
Petter Dass (c. 1647–1707), Norwegian Lutheran priest and poet
Petter Eide (born 1959), Norwegian politician
Petter Eldh (born 1983), Swedish jazz bass player and composer
Petter Eliassen (born 1985), Norwegian cross-country skier
Petter Emanuelsson (born 1991), Swedish ice hockey player
Petter Johnsen Ertzgaard (1784–1848), Norwegian politician and military officer
Petter Fagerhaug (born 1997), Norwegian cyclist
Petter Fauchald (1930–2013), Norwegian footballer
Petter Fladeby (born 1961), Danish film sound designer and mixer
Petter Røste Fossen (born 1991), Norwegian ice hockey player
Petter Furberg (1923–1999), Norwegian politician
Petter Furuseth (born 1978), Norwegian footballer
Petter Gottschalk (born 1950), Norwegian business theorist and professor
Petter Granberg (born 1992), Swedish ice hockey player
Petter Graver (1920–1995), Norwegian jurist and diplomat
Petter Gustafsson (born 1985), Swedish footballer
Petter Hagberg (alias of Brita Hagberg; 1756– 1825), Swedish woman who disguised herself as a man served as a soldier in the Swedish Army during the Russo-Swedish War
Petter Hansen, Norwegian ten-pin bowler
Petter Hansson (born 1976), Swedish footballer
Petter Hansson (born 1996), Swedish ice hockey player
Petter Hemming (born 1999), Finnish footballer
Petter Henriksen (born 1949), Norwegian musician and publisher
Petter Hol (1883–1981), Norwegian gymnast
Petter Hugsted (1921–2000), Norwegian ski jumper
Petter Jamvold (1899–1961), Norwegian sport sailor
Petter Jansen (born 1955), Norwegian businessman
Petter Karlsson (born 1977), Swedish rock instrumentalist and singer (Therion, Diablo Swing Orchestra, Snowy Shaw)
Petter Adolf Karsten (1834–1917), Finnish mycologist
Petter Kristiansen (alias Katastrofe; born 1989), Norwegian singer-songwriter
Petter Larsen (1890–1946), Norwegian sport sailor
Petter Lennartsson (born 1988), Swedish footballer
Petter Lie (1835–1917), Norwegian sailor and fisherman
Petter Lindström (1907–2000), Swedish-American neurosurgeon and former husband of actress Ingrid Bergman
Petter Løvik (1949–2007), Norwegian politician
Petter Martinsen (1887–1972), Norwegian gymnast
Petter Mejlænder (born 1952), Norwegian journalist, author and translator
Petter Menning (born 1987), Swedish sprint canoer
Petter Meyer (born 1985), Finnish footballer
Petter Moe-Johansen (also known as P. Petter Moe-Johansen; 1882–1952), Norwegian newspaper editor and politician
Petter Moen (1901–1944), Norwegian Resistance member during WWII
Petter Vaagan Moen (born 1984), Norwegian footballer
Petter Morottaja (born 1982), Finnish Inari Sámi language author
Petter Myhre (born 1972), Norwegian footballer
Petter Næss (born 1960), Norwegian actor and film director
Petter Nilssen (1869–1939), Norwegian master watchmaker and politician
Petter Nome (born 1954), Norwegian journalist and television presenter
Petter Northug (born 1986), Norwegian cross-country skier
Petter Øgar (born 1953), Norwegian physician and civil servant
Petter Olsen (born 1948), Norwegian businessman
Petter Mathias Olsen (born 1998), Norwegian footballer
Petter Olson (born 1991), Swedish decathlete
Petter Øverby (born 1992), Norwegian handball player
Petter Mørland Pedersen (born 1984), Norwegian sport sailor
Petter Pettersson (born 1939), Norwegian writer journalist
Petter Pettersson Jr. (1911–1984), Norwegian politician
Petter Pilgaard (born 1980), Norwegian television personality
Petter Planke (born 1937), Norwegian businessman
Petter Carl Reinsnes (1904–1976), Norwegian politician
Petter Rocha (born 1984), Uruguayan footballer
Petter Rönnquist (born 1973), Swedish ice hockey player
Petter Rudi (born 1973), Norwegian footballer
Petter Salsten (born 1965), Norwegian ice hockey player, coach and sports official
Petter Schjerven (born 1967), Norwegian television host
Petter Schramm (1946–2014), Norwegian poet
Petter Sevel (born 1974), Norwegian footballer
Petter Christian Singsaas (born 1972), Norwegian footballer
Petter Skarheim (born 1962), Norwegian civil servant
Petter Solberg (born 1974), Norwegian rally and rallycross driver
Petter Solli (born 1966), Norwegian footballer
Petter Steen Jr. (born 1962), Norwegian politician
Petter Stenborg (1719–1781), Swedish actor and theater director
Petter Stordalen (born 1962), Norwegian businessman
Petter Strand (born 1994), Norwegian footballer
Petter Stymne (born 1983), Swedish swimmer
Petter C. G. Sundt (1945–2007), Norwegian shipping magnate and businessman
Petter Tande (born 1985), Norwegian Nordic combined skier
Petter Thoresen (born 1961), Norwegian ice hockey player and coach
Petter Thoresen (born 1966), Norwegian orienteer
Petter Thomassen (1941–2003), Norwegian politician
Petter Vågan (born 1982), Norwegian singer-songwriter and guitarist
Petter Vennerød (born 1948), Norwegian film director
Petter Villegas (born 1975), Ecuadorian-American footballer

References

Masculine given names
Scandinavian masculine given names
Norwegian masculine given names
Swedish masculine given names
Finnish masculine given names